Bharat PetroResources (BPRL) is a wholly-owned subsidiary of Bharat Petroleum Corporation, a central public sector undertaking company functioning under the Ministry of Petroleum and Natural Gas, Government of India. It is engaged in the refining and marketing of petroleum products and is recognized as Maharatna as well as a Fortune Global 500 company.

BPRL is the upstream oil and gas exploration and production arm of BPCL with both Indian and worldwide exploration projects.

History 
BPRL was formed in 2006 with an authorised capital of ₹1,000 crore to embark on the exploration of oil fields across the globe and expand crude supply to its parent firm Bharat Petroleum Corporation.

BPRL pursues oil and gas development projects from Brazil to Mozambique. The company has acquired a 40 percent stake in an ultra-deepwater hydrocarbon block in Brazil for USD 1.6 billion after seeking approval from the Union Cabinet On July 27, 2022. The block is expected to start production by 2026-27. Brazil's national oil company Petrobras owns and operates it with a 60 percent interest.

As of 2022, BPRL has Participating Interest (PI) in 26 oil and gas blocks, 13 of which are located in India and an equal number in overseas.

Of these 13 overseas blocks, six are in Brazil, two are situated in UAE, and one each is in Australia, Indonesia, Mozambique, Timor Leste, and Israel. The blocks of BPRL are in various stages of exploration, appraisal, pre-development, and production phases.

BPRL has equity stake in two Russian companies including Taas-Yuryakh Neftegazodobycha, which is a subsidiary of Rosneft established in 2000 holding the license to produce oil and gas from four producing blocks in Russia. BPRL also holds a stake in the special purpose vehicle (SPV), Urja Bharat Pte Limited, which bid for the Abu Dhabi exploration block.

The company reported a consolidated income of Rs 181 crore and a loss of Rs 96 crore for the financial year (FY) 2018-19, as opposed to a consolidated income of Rs 216 crore and a loss of Rs 68.72 crore in the previous fiscal year.

Board of directors 

 Arun Kumar Singh (Director)
 Vetsa Ramakrishna Gupta (Director)
 Sanjay Khanna (Director)
 Kamal Chopra, Director (Finance)
 Krishnakant Joshi, Director (Operations & Business Development)
 Rajinder Kumar, (Government Director)
 Mona Jaiswal, (Independent Director)

References

External links 

 Official website

Oil and gas companies of India
Oil pipeline companies
Government-owned companies of India
Energy companies established in 2006
Non-renewable resource companies established in 2006
Indian companies established in 2006
Companies nationalised by the Government of India
Indian brands
India